The V/Line VLocity, sometimes called the VLocity 160, is a diesel multiple unit train built by Bombardier Transportation (later Alstom) in Dandenong for V/Line, the regional rail operator in Victoria. As of October 2022, 100 3-car sets are in revenue service, 2 collision damaged sets are in storage, and 16 more are under construction on the current order.

History

Design origins and testing 
To honour a commitment made when it was awarded the V/Line franchise, National Express requested tenders in early 2000 for 29 two-carriage diesel multiple units. The contract was extended to 38 two-car units and an initial fifteen-year maintenance contract. By the time the first was delivered, the V/Line franchise had reverted to the state government, while Adtranz had been taken over by Bombardier Transportation.

The design was an evolution of the Xplorer/Endeavour railcars. Although Bombardier originally intended to use the same body shell design as the Endeavour, difficulties with the aerodynamic drag characteristics of this shape for the intended  operational speed of the VLocity led to a complete redesign of the train body. Ultimately, the VLocity was designed concurrently with the B series being developed for Transperth as an electric multiple unit, resulting in a number of shared design elements.

The original plan was for the 29 sets to be fitted with 2+3 seating, for a total capacity of 173 passengers per two-carriage set. However, in February 2003, that was changed to 144 seats in a 2+2 formation.

In 2003, it was announced that the units would be built in Bombardier's Dandenong factory, with the bogies to be constructed at Bombardier's Derby Litchurch Lane Works in England, and the control system to be supplied by Bombardier's plant in Västerås, Sweden. The first unit was completed in July 2004, and testing began shortly after.

Safety improvements were suggested at various stages in the development of the VLocity and, following the Waterfall accident in New South Wales, in which a train derailed when travelling too fast around a curve, and the Cairns Tilt Train derailment in Queensland, which occurred in similar circumstances, the State Government announced in December 2004 that the Train Protection & Warning System (TPWS) would be installed on Regional Fast Rail lines and the VLocity trains. In August 2005, the State Government commissioned an investigation into the fitting of seat belts on the trains, although the concept was considered potentially expensive and technically challenging.

Testing revealed noise levels were too high in the cabin, delaying the introduction of the trains into service while the completed sets were modified.

Into service 

The VLocity was introduced into service on the Ballarat line on 22 December 2005, with Bracks and Transport Minister Peter Batchelor travelling on the inaugural service from Southern Cross station. An unveiling ceremony was held at Ballarat and the train returned as a regular service. Services on the Geelong and Bendigo lines followed on 3 February 2006 and 24 February 2006 respectively. Services to Traralgon and Seymour were introduced in September 2006. A timetable allowing the VLocity to operate at its  design speed was introduced on 3 September, despite allegations by the State Opposition of ongoing issues with the TPWS. In addition, the Ararat and Echuca services are operated by VLocitys. From 2010, one Ballarat line service each day was extended to Maryborough.

In 2005, the VLocity received an Australian Design Award, the first rail vehicle to do so, as well as an accolade from Engineers Australia.

On 10 November 2008, seven-carriage-long VLocity trains (2x 2 carriage + 1x 3 carriage sets) commenced regular operation on peak-hour Geelong line services. Previously, the longest trains were six carriages (3x 2 carriage sets). With the introduction of fixed 3 carriage sets it was no longer possible to run 7 carriage trains but as of June 2022 limited 9 carriage trains run to Wyndham Vale in peak times

Additions to the fleet 

After the initial order of 38 units, a further two VLocity units were later ordered to bring the total to 40, along with 22 new intermediate trailers to be inserted in the middle of existing VLocity sets. The first 14 were promised during the 2006 State Election, and the order was placed in December the same year. The order for the next eight was announced on 12 October 2007.

In July 2008, the State Government ordered nine new three-car units, and an additional intermediate car to be inserted into an existing two-car unit, with an extra four carriages added in February 2009. The final unit of the order was delivered in September 2011.

With the availability of improved technologies for train control, from mid-2012, sets 3VL30, 3VL40 and 3VL50 were selected by Bombardier as test sets for equipment upgrades, in order to minimise the number of sets containing non-standard systems.

In November 2012, the State Government announced an additional 40 carriages will be delivered between 2014 and 2016. The order comprised seven additional 3-car sets plus 19 intermediate cars to increase the remaining 2-car sets to 3-cars.

In March 2014, the order for 40 carriages was increased to 43. Further orders were placed for 21 carriages In May 2015 and 27 carriages in April 2016. 

All 2 carriage VLocity sets had been converted to 3 carriage sets by May 2018.

In December 2017, a further nine sets were ordered. Once all have been delivered, the fleet will comprise 88 3-car sets. Of these, sets 76-79 will be of a modified configuration, with a single toilet per three-carriage set instead of two, improvements to CCTV, downrating of the engines to 650 hp each for fuel economy and altered standing and seating arrangements. Sets from 80 to 88 will revert to two toilets with modified seating and a different front to accommodate a safer driving cabin. As of 6 November 2020 units 80-88 have entered revenue service.

After jockey Michelle Payne won the 2015 Melbourne Cup horse race riding Prince of Penzance, becoming the first female jockey to win the race, set 3VL9 was named Michelle Payne in honour of her regional Victorian ancestry. The set was the first VLocity to be named and the first V/Line train to be named since the Sprinters in the late 20th century.

In the 2018 Victorian state election campaign, the Andrews government promised that, if re-elected, it would place an order for 18 additional three-car VLocity sets to be delivered from 2021.

In the 2022 Victorian state election campaign, the Andrews government promised that, if re-elected, it would place an order for an additional 23 three-car VLocity sets, as part of a promise to boost regional weekend services. The government also committed to introucing nine-car VLocity trains to service the Melton railway line in Melbourne's west.

Wheel wear restrictions 
In January 2016, V/Line removed approximately a quarter of VLocity units from service after identifying unusually high rates of wear to wheel flanges. Although unusual wear patterns had been observed since December of the previous year across the V/Line fleet, V/Line CEO Theo Taifalos ordered the withdrawal of the most badly affected units for safety reasons.

Meanwhile, on 15 January 2016 a VLocity set failed to activate boom gates at the Progress Street level crossing in Dandenong. This led Metro Trains to ban all sets from operating on suburban lines until the issue had been resolved. The combined restrictions on the VLocity fleet led to the daily cancellation of nearly 70 V/Line services from mid-January.

By the beginning of March, Bombardier had increased its capacity to remachine affected wheels, and track identified as potentially contributing to the wheel wear situation had been reprofiled; as a consequence, VLocity units were gradually returned to service.

In April, a report by the Institute of Railway Technology at Monash University identified tight curves and an inadequate track lubrication on the newly opened Regional Rail Link, particularly along the North Melbourne Flyover near North Melbourne Station, which was upgraded as part of the project as a means of allowing V/Line services to access Platforms 1-8 at Southern Cross without needing to use Metropolitan tracks, as the root cause of the increase in wheel wear, and suggested that the relatively stiff suspension of the VLocity was the reason it had been most severely affected.

Design evolution 
The New Generation Rollingstock ordered for Queensland Rail from Bombardier, although built in India, are based on the VLocity design and the A-City 4000 Class EMU used by Adelaide Metro, which was itself based on the VLocity shell.  The Transperth B Series Train is closely related to the VLocity as both were designed at the same time by the same company.

A 2016 asset management report presented by V/Line noted that the VLocity would be unsuitable for higher passenger loads without a complete body redesign, and acknowledged that the operational performance of the VLocity was hampered by the inferior acceleration of V/Line's locomotive-hauled fleet. The 2016–17 Victorian budget allocated funds for a project to redesign the VLocity for long-haul services, particularly those to Shepparton, Warrnambool and Albury/Wodonga.

By late 2017, design work had begun on modifications to the interior for  Many of the changes were required for improved compliance with the Disability Discrimination Act. For the later order of 3VL80 and above, more significant alterations to the crash protection in the driver's cabin were introduced.

In October 2018, the state government announced that a new interior layout would be introduced on units 3VR76-3VR79 and 3VL80-3VL88 with 14 extra seats per three-carriage set, at the expense of removing a toilet and bike storage rack from each set. Cycling lobby groups criticised the new layout, but the government argued that the sets would be restricted to short-distance routes where the additional capacity would be valuable. The first of the updated type entered service in August 2019.

As at February 2023 the current confirmed orders for new sets will bring the total to 118.

Introduction to long-distance service 

In the lead up to the 2018 Victorian election, opposition leader Matthew Guy announced that his party, if elected to government, would order 16 6-car VLocity variants from Bombardier for dedicated long-distance operation, with catering and first class facilities.

From May 2018, improvements to level crossing infrastructure saw test VLocity runs to Bairnsdale, ahead of an introduction to revenue service on the line later in the year. At the same time, government representatives announced that the long-haul variant of the VLocity would include onboard refreshment facilities and improved seats. A media event was held at Bairnsdale in July of that year, at which it was announced that 2 of 3 daily Bairnsdale trains would be taken over by VLocity sets.

In May 2018, the Rail Tram and Bus Union (RTBU) announced that it had received confirmation that a buffet facility would be included in new intermediate carriages, added to existing sets to form 4-car trains for long-distance services.

In April 2020, designs for standard gauge VLocity sets, to be used on the Albury line, were released by the Department of Transport showing a standard 3 carriage layout with centre trailer carriage kiosk.

Standard gauge sets VS93 and VS94 entered service on 30 December 2021 on the Albury line.

As at June 2022 there is six 3 carriage standard gauge sets in service numbered VS93-98.

Design

Technical 
There are four car types in the VLocity class:
 The Driver Motor with Disabled Access cars, numbered 11xx & 21xx and designated DM(D) and;
 The Driver Motor cars, numbered 12xx & 22xx and designated DM with either;
 The standard Trailer Motor cars, numbered 13xx & 23xx and designated TM or;
 The Kiosk fitted Trailer Motor cars, numbered 15xx and designated TMC. 

It is usual for the set of semi-permanently coupled cars to be described as zVLxx where z indicates the number of carriages in the fixed set while xx is the final two digits of the car designation – for example, the set 1150-1350-1250 would be described as 3VL50 while standard gauge sets use the VSxx format., the 2VL designation has not been used since May 2018 when the last remaining 2 carriage VLocity Set was converted to 3 carriages. Together, a permanently coupled three-car unit has a mass of 171 tonnes.

With the introduction of set 100 onward the VL designation will continue as VL100 and so on however set 100 onward use 2xxx carriage numbering, for example set VL101 consists of 2101-2301-2201

Power is provided by a Cummins QSK 19R diesel engine in each car, attached on a separate underframe. The engine powers both axles on one bogie in each car, while the other bogie is unpowered. The engine is supplemented by an  Cummins auxiliary power unit for lighting and air-conditioning purposes. The VLocity uses a Voith T312 hydraulic transmission system with dynamic braking capabilities.

The primary suspension system of the VLocity is composed of a traction rod, with two elastomer bushes, linking the axle box and bogie frame.

Among the design innovations in the VLocity units are the integration of the air-conditioning unit into the ceiling superstructure, and a structurally isolated crumple zone in the nose which can be entirely replaced with a new module following a crash.

VLocity units use Scharfenberg couplers, enabling them to operate with other VLocity units.

VLocitys operate throughout the V/Line broad gauge passenger network and also on the ARTC controlled standard gauge line to Albury (NSW), as with most other V/Line services. The bogies were manufactured by Bombardier's Derby Litchurch Lane Works, and are fully gauge-convertible.

The VLocity units have a design life of 35 years.

Interior 

The driver's console for the VLocity is a dashboard mounted slightly below the one-piece front windscreen of the train. There are two seats in the driving cabin; the active driver's seat is positioned slightly to the left of the train's centre, with the second seat slightly behind. The train is controlled by a combined throttle and brake lever, which has six power levels and the ability to vary the brake application. There is also an independent brake lever and a reverser handle in the driver's primary controls.  When the trailer cars were added to the existing 2 carriage sets the driver cabs were retro fitted with the extra gauges to monitor the trailer unit driveline.

The seating layout for the VLocity is 2+2, with a mix of club-style seats facing each other, and aircraft-style rows. The seats cannot be rotated to face any particular direction, and seat backs do not recline. Four wheelchair spaces are provided in each set through the provision of tip-up seats. The VLocity offers economy-class seating only, although the seat width is equivalent to first class seating on V/Line locomotive-hauled services. In response to passenger feedback, the seatback angle in the intermediate carriages was made 2.5 degrees more upright than the original carriages. New deliveries from July 2010 onwards (3VL42 and above) featured a changed seatback angle and new seat fabrics.

While VLocity carriages have tinted windows, they lack the curtains as provided by older V/Line rolling stock. Passengers may move freely between the three semi-permanently coupled vehicles in a set, but not between the sets themselves. Conductors move between coupled sets at station stops.

Tables were installed in one unit (2VL28) for evaluation purposes, but were later removed. In three-car VLocity units, 32 seats in the intermediate carriage have fold-down tray tables, much like the first class seats on locomotive-hauled services.

Overhead racks exist for small baggage, while larger baggage is stored in the middle of the unit, with some spaces large enough for surfboards and bicycles. In January 2008, passengers were banned from taking bicycles on VLocity trains during peak hours, despite the designated bike area, with the ban repealed in February 2008.

The standard gauge long distance sets have kiosk style catering.

The all metal construction and metalised window tinting of the VLocity trains is an effective (measured at 20dB) blocker of all forms of radio communications into and out of the carriages including Mobiles phone signals preventing passengers from making reliable calls or utilising data devices. To overcome this in an Australian first a joint venture between Telstra, V/Line, VicTrack, Alstom and CommScope to retrofit specially designed 3G/4G Mobile Phone Repeater units into all existing VLocity sets in 2018 was created, this included the installation of repeater units in all new VLocity sets built after the joint venture commencement date. The repeater is manufactured by CommScope and is designed to rebroadcast the main 3G & 4G frequency spectrum utilised by the three Mobiles Phone network providers, Telstra, Optus and TPG Telecom (Vodafone Australia) in Australia. The program included state government funding for 35 additional Mobile base stations to fix coverage Black Spots for the three networks that the in train repeaters could not overcome.

Livery 

The original VLocity livery consisted of purple and green facings on a stainless steel car body.

In March 2008, newly built VLocity set 3VL41 was outshopped with an altered cab livery following recommendations in recent level crossing accident reports to make trains more visible to motorists. Portions of reflective yellow were added to the cabs, along with more reflective silver directly beneath the cab windscreen. All units were retrospectively treated.

In June 2010, newly built set 3VL42 was released in a new livery of crimson stripe at roof level replacing the purple, and red replacing the green, a red stripe along the car body below the windows, white doors, and yellow front.

In 2014, 3VL40 had a new Public Transport Victoria livery applied. All sets from 3VL52 were delivered in this livery.

Reception and impact 
The VLocity seating layout is 2+2 instead of the 2+3 seating provided in other V/Line saloon-type carriages. A single VLocity car seats around 70 passengers, compared to 89 in the previous generation Sprinter with its narrower 2+3 seats.

The Regional Fast Rail project for which the VLocitys were built was criticised for cost blow-outs during construction. These included the cost of installing extra safety measures deemed necessary for 160 km/h operation, which were added to the project after the Waterfall rail accident in New South Wales.

By 2012, the VLocity trains and attendant decreases in travel time were regarded as major factors in the economic revival of towns along V/Line routes. The combined effect of the trains' comfort, speed and reliability was noted to have enabled the creation of new commuter belt locations outside of Melbourne, and the increases in train frequency which followed the introduction of the VLocity sets was said to have substantially improved the convenience of accessing Melbourne from the Bendigo, Ballarat and Geelong regions.

A 2014 report by the federal government's Department of Infrastructure and Regional Development found that the VLocity trains had contributed to the overall success of the Regional Fast Rail project in increasing the accessibility of rail services for regional Victoria. The case study concluded that the improved ride quality of the trains was a significant contributor to improved passenger perceptions of rail services, and that the increased service frequency made possible by the trains was ultimately more beneficial from an operational perspective than any real or perceived time savings.

Accidents and incidents 
On 28 April 2006, set 2VL29 was involved in a collision at a level crossing at Trawalla while travelling from Ararat. It collided with a large triaxle road trailer carrying a 16-tonne block of stone and two heavy press machines. The front of the train withstood the impact with the trailer, but the press machines were thrown loose, striking and penetrating the cab. The incident caused two fatalities. At the time of the impact, three people were in the cab, the driver – who was seriously injured – and two off-duty Pacific National drivers – one of whom was injured, and the other killed. As the train continued through the crossing, the rear trailer swung around and the stone block was thrown off, striking and partially penetrating the side of the leading car 1129, killing the mother of the train driver, who had been travelling as a passenger. Forty others received injuries in the crash. The unit had been in service for seven days before the accident. After the accident, both cars were taken to Newport Workshops for examination. Carriage 1129 suffered the most damage and was written off. Carriage 1229, having received relatively minor damage, was sent to Bombardier, Dandenong for repairs. It was later renumbered 1241 and marshalled together with new cars 1141 and 1341.

On 5 May 2006, VLocity set 2VL4 travelling on the 09:38 service from Southern Cross to Ararat collided with a car at the protected Rockbank level crossing near Melton. Thirty train passengers and the driver of the car were taken to hospital.

During a passenger service to Bendigo on 26 February 2010, the driver of sets 2VL6, 2VL5 and 2VL17, at the time three two-car sets coupled in that order, was alerted to the smell of smoke in the leading car of 2VL5. The train stopped at Watergardens, where the driver and a relief driver also on board the train discovered a fire in the park brake system of 2VL5, which they were able to extinguish quickly. 2VL6 was decoupled and continued to Bendigo without incident. An investigation found that the park brake had either not been released on departure or had been inadvertently activated by the relief driver, who was travelling in the empty cab of the 2VL5 lead car.

On 22 August 2014, a Metro Trains Comeng train, which had departed Laverton en route to Flinders Street, stopped after the driver noticed a loud noise and an apparent fault in his train's braking system. VLocity set 2VL5, which was being transferred from Geelong to Southern Cross without passengers, passed a red automatic signal without adhering to safe procedures for that situation, and the driver was unable to stop before colliding with the stationary Metro train. The driver of the VLocity and 8 passengers on the Metro train sustained minor injuries. An investigation by the Australian Transport Safety Bureau found that the driver of the VLocity, travelling too fast for the situation, was distracted and failed to notice the inadequate rear marker lights of the Metro train.

On 15 February 2017, VLocity set 3VL34 collided with a vehicle that had been abandoned on the line near  and was derailed. Two people were injured.

30 May 2020 3VL70 failed to stop due to a braking issue at the Ballarat station and collided with the historic Lydiard St swing gate level crossing at 93km/h finally stopping some 600m past its intended stopping point.

14 July 2022 3VL35, on a scheduled Echuca - Southern Cross service, collided with a semi trailer on an uncontrolled level crossing near Goornong (30km NE of Bendigo), none of the train's 40 passengers were injured, but both the train and truck driver were transported to hospital.

Operations 
Technically, a maximum of four VLocity sets may be coupled together for operation as a single consist. Between 2008 and 2016, seven-car VLocity trains operated on the Geelong line, made up of two two-car sets and a three-car set. However, following the conversion of the entire VLocity fleet to three-car sets, all trains have operated as three or six cars. From 30 May 2022, nine-car VLocity trains started operating between Wyndham Vale and Southern Cross during peak hours. 

The VLocity is authorised to run in revenue service:

 on the North East line from Melbourne to Seymour, Shepparton, and on standard gauge to Albury
 on the Gippsland line from Melbourne to Traralgon and Bairnsdale
 on the Bendigo line from Melbourne to Bendigo, and then to Eaglehawk on the Swan Hill line and Echuca on the Echuca line
 on the Warrnambool line from Melbourne to Waurn Ponds
 on the Serviceton line to Ballarat and then to Ararat, and from Ballarat to Maryborough on the Mildura line.

VLocity trains are permitted to run up to  only on lines where all level crossings are protected by boom gates and lights and track upgrades have been completed. However, services to Echuca and Ararat run on lines that do not meet these standards, and as a result, cannot reach their full speed. The Echuca line is currently undergoing works to allow it to reach . In 2017, the State Government announced upgrade works to extend VLocity services to Warrnambool, Albury and Bairnsdale, and in 2019 announced upgrades to allow them to run to Shepparton.

A VLocity simulator is used by V/Line for driver training. The simulator replicates the driving cabin of the VLocity and includes forward vision and rear mirror graphics and audio effects. An instructor positioned outside the simulator can control track conditions and replicate some faults with the train itself.

With the completion of the new Avon River Bridge at Stratford and various line upgrade works VLocity services commenced to Bairnsdale in July 2018.

On 21 June 2020, a 9-car train, consisting of sets 3VL7, 3VL63 and 3VL23, undertook a test run from Southern Cross to Wyndham Vale to test 9-car operation and platform fitat several stations. As of June 2022 there is now 9 carriage services from Wyndham Vale and Southern Cross in peak periods.

Standard gauge VLocity services on the Albury line began on 30 December 2021.

VLocity services to Shepparton began revenue services from 31 October 2022.

Notes

Explanatory notes

Citations

References 

 
 
 
 
 

Bombardier Transportation multiple units
Diesel multiple units of Victoria (Australia)
Alstom multiple units